Gleason is an Irish surname.  It is an anglicisation of the Irish name Ó Glasáin or Ó Gliasáin.  Most common in County Tipperary but originating in East County Cork, in the once powerful Uí Liatháin kingdom, where the Gleasons were great lords and sometimes kings.

The name may refer to:

People

In arts and entertainment
Adda Gleason (1888–1971), American actress
Bill Gleason (1922-2010), panelist on The Sportswriters on TV
F. Keogh Gleason (1906–1982), American film-set decorator at MGM studios
Gina Gleason, American guitarist
Jackie Gleason (1916–1987), American comedian and actor
James Gleason (1882–1959), American actor, playwright, and screenwriter
Joanna Gleason (born 1950), Canadian actress
Madeline Gleason (1909–1973), American poet and dramatist
Max Gleason, American musician and YouTuber, better known as Smooth McGroove
Patrick Gleason (artist), contemporary comic book artist
Paul Gleason (1939–2006), American film and television actor
Ralph J. Gleason (1917–1975), American jazz and pop music critic
Russell Gleason (1907–1945), American actor
Vanessa Gleason (born 1979), American model and actress, Playboy Playmate of the Month

In government, law, and politics
Charles R. Gleason (1830-1907), American politician and businessman
Herbert P. Gleason (died 2013), American lawyer
James P. Gleason (1921-2008), American lawyer and politician, legislative assistant to Richard Nixon
John J. Gleason, American politician
Lafayette Blanchard Gleason, Secretary of the Republican State Committee
Mary J. L. Gleason (fl. 1980s–2020s) Justice of the Federal Court of Appeal of Canada
Patrick Jerome "Battle-Axe" Gleason (1844–1901), Irish-born mayor of Long Island City, New York, US
Robert A. Gleason Jr. (contemporary), American politician, chairman of the Pennsylvania Republican Party
William E. Gleason (1830s–after 1880), Justice of the Dakota Territorial Supreme Court 
William Henry Gleason (1829–1902), American real-estate developer and politician; cofounder of the city of Eau Gallie, Florida
William H. H. Gleason (fl. early 20th century), American school administrator of Brevard County School District, Florida

In science and academia
Andrew Gleason (1921–2008), American mathematician
Donald Gleason, American pathologist
Henry Gleason (1882–1975), American ecologist, botanist, and taxonomist
Jean Berko Gleason, American psycholinguist

In sports
Ben Gleason (born 1998), American  hockey player
Bill Gleason (1858–1932), American baseball player
Bill Gleason (pitcher) (1868–1893), American baseball player
Erin Gleason (born 1977), American speed skater
Jimmy Gleason (1898–1931), American Indy 500 racecar driver
Steve Gleason (born 1977), American football player
Tim Gleason (born 1983), American hockey player
William J. "Kid" Gleason (1866–1933), American baseball player and manager

In other fields
George W. Gleason, American World War II flying ace - see List of World War II flying aces
Kate Gleason (1865–1933), American engineer and businesswoman
Robert Gleason (murderer) (1970–2013), American convicted murderer
William Henry Gleason (1829–1902), American real estate developer and politician, cofounder of the city of Eau Gallie, Florida, United States
William Lansing Gleason (fl. 20th century), cofounder of the town of Indian Harbour Beach, Florida

Fictional characters
Kirk Gleason, in the television series Gilmore Girls

See also
Justice Gleason (disambiguation)
Gleason (disambiguation)
Gleeson (disambiguation)

References